Corno Giovine (Lodigiano:  or ) is a comune (municipality) in the Province of Lodi in the Italian region Lombardy, located about  southeast of Milan and about  southeast of Lodi.

Corno Giovine borders the following municipalities: Maleo, Cornovecchio, Santo Stefano Lodigiano, Santo Stefano Lodigiano, Caselle Landi, Piacenza.

References

Cities and towns in Lombardy